Erlanger's gazelle or Neumann's gazelle, (Gazella erlangeri), is a small dark gazelle with a stout body and short legs. It is described from Saudi Arabia and Yemen.

It is considered a threatened species, although no recent information is available on wild populations. Some sources consider it a subspecies of the mountain gazelle (Gazella gazella).

References

erlangeri
Mammals of Asia
Mammals of the Middle East